Cosmacanthus is an extinct genus of placoderms in the extinct family Groenlandaspididae that lived during the Late Devonian in Ireland, the UK, Russia and North America. It was named by Louis Agassiz in 1845.

 Names brought to synonymy
 †Cosmacanthus elegans, a synonym for †Nemacanthus elegans Evans, 1904 (elasmobranch)

See also 
 List of placoderm genera

References

External links 

 
 

Arthrodire genera